Gamwell is a surname. Notable people with this name include:
Marian Gamwell, commander of First Aid Nursing Yeomanry, given OBE in 1946 New Year Honours
Bruce Gamwell, headmaster (2000–2004) of Saint John's International School (Thailand)
Franklin I. Gamwell, American scholar of religion and ethics
Corporal Joan Gamwell, Women's Auxiliary Air Force, given British Empire Medal in 1947 New Year Honours
Lynn Gamwell (born 1943), American author and art curator
Terry Gamwell, songwriter of The Line (Lisa Stansfield song) 
William Gamwell, original name of legendary character Will Scarlet, one of Robin Hood's Merry Men